Foster Island may refer to:

 Foster Island (Ontario)
 Foster Island (Washington)
 Foster Islands (Tasmania)